Eucalyptus pyrenea, commonly known as Pyrenees gum, is a species of tree that is endemic to Victoria, Australia. It has smooth, greyish bark with rough, fibrous bark on the lower part of the trunk, lance-shaped to curved adult leaves, flower buds in groups of seven, white flowers and cup-shaped fruit.

Description
It has smooth, greyish bark with some rough, fibrous or flaky bark near the base. Flowering occurs in autumn and the flowers are white.

Taxonomy
Eucalyptus pyrenea was first formally described in 2004 by Kevin James Rule from material he collected on Mount Avoca in the Pyrenees Ranges in 2001.

Distribution and habitat
Pyrenees gum is only known from the type location where it grows in shallow soil on dry, rocky slopes.

See also
List of Eucalyptus species

References

Trees of Australia
pyrenea
Myrtales of Australia
Flora of Victoria (Australia)
Plants described in 2004